This is a list of the Historic-Cultural Monuments in the Wilshire, Westlake  and nearby areas of Los Angeles, California.  There are more than 142 Historic-Cultural Monuments (HCM) in these areas. The sites have been designated by the Los Angeles Cultural Heritage Commission as worthy of preservation based on architectural, historic and cultural criteria.

Historic-Cultural Monuments

Non-HCM historic sites recognized by state and nation

See also

Lists of L.A. Historic-Cultural Monuments
 Historic-Cultural Monuments in Downtown Los Angeles
 Historic-Cultural Monuments on the East and Northeast Sides
 Historic-Cultural Monuments in the Harbor area
 Historic-Cultural Monuments in Hollywood
 Historic-Cultural Monuments in the San Fernando Valley
 Historic-Cultural Monuments in Silver Lake, Angelino Heights, and Echo Park
 Historic-Cultural Monuments in South Los Angeles
 Historic-Cultural Monuments on the Westside

Other
 City of Los Angeles' Historic Preservation Overlay Zones
 National Register of Historic Places listings in Los Angeles
 National Register of Historic Places listings in Los Angeles County
 List of California Historical Landmarks

References

External links
 official Designated L.A. Historic-Cultural Monuments (LAHCM) website — with 'ever-updated' LAHCM list via PDF link.
 LAHCM Report for Wilshire — L.A. Planning Department.
 LAHCM Report for Westlake
 City of Los Angeles Map, with community districts. — via Given Place Media.
 Big Orange Landmarks:  "Exploring the Landmarks of Los Angeles, One Monument at a Time" — L.A.H.C.Monuments in Wilshire area.  — online photos and in-depth history. — website curator: Floyd B. Bariscale.
 Big Orange Landmarks:  "Exploring the Landmarks of Los Angeles, One Monument at a Time" — L.A.H.C.Monuments in Westlake district.

 
Central Los Angeles

Wilshire
Los Angeles-related lists